Lake Martha is a lake in Kings Canyon National Park, on the Le Conte Divide,  north of Mount Reinstein and  southwest of Mount Goddard. Lake Martha is notable for being the source of the south fork of the San Joaquin River. It is also on the easiest route to Hell for Sure Pass. Due to its elevation, it can be completely frozen at high summer (August).

See also
List of lakes in California

References

Lakes of Fresno County, California
Kings Canyon National Park
San Joaquin River
Lakes of California
Lakes of Northern California